The third season of True Detective, an American anthology crime drama television series created by Nic Pizzolatto, was confirmed by HBO on August 31, 2017, and  premiered on January 13, 2019. The story takes place in the Ozarks over three decades, as partner detectives investigate a macabre crime involving two missing children. The opening theme of the season is the song "Death Letter" written by Son House and performed by Cassandra Wilson from her 1995 album New Moon Daughter.

Mahershala Ali plays the lead role of detective Wayne Hays, while Stephen Dorff plays his partner detective Roland West. The season marks Pizzolatto's directorial debut, with the series creator dividing up directing assignments with Jeremy Saulnier and Daniel Sackheim. Pizzolatto also serves as the showrunner and sole writer of the season, with the exception of the fourth and sixth episode, which he co-wrote with David Milch and Graham Gordy respectively.

Production

Background 
In November 2015, a few months after the conclusion of the second season, HBO reached an overall deal through 2018 with series creator and executive producer Nic Pizzolatto, that called for him to develop a number of new projects, that could include a third season of True Detective. Talking about the deal, the president of HBO programming Michael Lombardo stated, "I am thrilled to continue our relationship with Nic, as he is one of the most exceptionally talented writers and producers working today. I look forward to seeing where his unique creative vision will take us next."

In regard to a potential third season, Variety reported that the network had requested some changes that included Pizzolatto working with a staff of writers or possibly having a new showrunner. These changes would address the issue of the second season being received less favorably than the first, which was in part attributed to the lack of a creative counterpart to Pizzolatto. In the first season, strong artistic input from Cary Joji Fukunaga, who had directed all eight episodes, is said to have benefited the show. However, with the second season enlisting multiple directors, Pizzolatto had wielded more creative control, conceiving and executing the season on his own. In June 2015, in an interview with Vanity Fair, Pizzolatto had stated, "If I'm making a movie or a show or whatever, I'm expressing something on a personal level or else it doesn't mean anything to me. If I'm doing that, it works better without a committee."

Development 

In July 2016, Casey Bloys, who had succeeded Lombardo as HBO head of programming two months earlier, confirmed plans for a third season, describing True Detective as "a valuable franchise" and revealing that both the network and creator Pizzolatto were open to another season. In March 2017, it was revealed that David Milch had been recruited to assist Pizzolatto in preparing the third season, and that writing the first two episodes had already been completed. In June 2017, The Tracking Board reported that Mahershala Ali was in early discussions with HBO to play the lead role of the season. In July 2017, Bloys told reporters at the press tour of the Television Critics Association that Pizzolatto had written the third season almost in its entirety, and added "When we find a director, we'll be a go on that."

On August 31, 2017, after director Jeremy Saulnier was confirmed to work alongside Pizzolatto, HBO officially greenlit the third season of True Detective. The story was announced to span three decades and take place in the Ozarks, as partner detectives investigate a macabre crime, with Ali in the lead role of state police detective Wayne Hays. Talking about the renewal, Bloys stated: "Nic has written truly remarkable scripts. With his ambitious vision and Mahershala Ali and Jeremy Saulnier aboard, we are excited to embark on the next installment of True Detective." Besides Pizzolatto, who also serves as the season's showrunner, other executive producers of the season include Saulnier, Fukunaga, Scott Stephens, season one stars Woody Harrelson and Matthew McConaughey, along with Steve Golin, Bard Dorros, and Richard Brown.

Cast and crew 

Saulnier was expected to direct the first three episodes of the season. However, in March 2018, after he had completed the first two episodes, Saulnier exited the series due to scheduling conflicts, though multiple sources reported "differences of opinion" with Pizzolatto. Daniel Sackheim was announced to replace Saulnier, with the veteran director also being added as an executive producer for the season. Sackheim would divide up directing assignments on the remaining episodes with Pizzolatto, who also serves as the sole writer of the season, except for the episodes four and six, which he co-wrote with David Milch and Graham Gordy respectively.

Following other critically acclaimed actors who had starred in the first two seasons of the series, Academy Award-winner Mahershala Ali plays the lead role of state police detective Wayne Hays. In an interview with Variety, Ali revealed that he was originally offered a supporting role, as the main character was supposed to be white. However, pursuing a better choice for his career, he convinced Pizzolatto that he was suited for the lead. In November 2017, Carmen Ejogo was announced to star alongside Ali, in the role of schoolteacher Amelia Reardon, and in January 2018, Stephen Dorff was announced to play the co-lead role of partner detective Roland West. Joining them in a series regular role, Ray Fisher plays Wayne Hays' son Henry, while the season also includes a number of recurring roles. In January 2018, The Agency Inc. issued casting calls for up to 1,500 actors, stand-ins and photo-doubles to begin filming in Northwest Arkansas, with the agency's CEO noting, "This is the largest production we've ever cast." Additional casting calls were issued in June 2018 on Backstage, for Asian talent to portray Vietnamese civilians and soldiers.

Filming 

In February 2018, filming began in Arkansas, with Jeremy Saulnier and Nic Pizzolatto splitting directing assignments. However, Saulnier exited the production early, after he had directed the first two episodes of the season, as it had become clear that filming would take longer than expected to complete. On March 30, 2018, in addition to reports on scheduling conflicts, Variety wrote in regard to Saulnier's departure: "Sources said the filming on location in Arkansas has been tough at times, and that Pizzolatto and Saulnier had differences of opinion on the episodes." Saulnier was replaced by veteran director Daniel Sackheim, who would also divide directing assignments on the remaining six episodes with Pizzolatto.

The season was filmed by Random Productions LLC at various locations throughout Northwest Arkansas, including Fayetteville, Bentonville, Lincoln, Rogers and Springdale. Filming took place mainly in Fayetteville, from Mount Sequoyah to homes, apartments and restaurants around the city. Filming on location also included the use of stunts and pyrotechnics in residential areas, namely car explosions, smoke and loud noises. In regard to production on the series taking place in Arkansas, the director of Arkansas Economic Development Commission had stated in December 2017, "This is the largest and most expensive production we've ever had in the state. With an estimated year from start to finish, we know that local businesses and vendors will enjoy a boon from the production."

The season wrapped filming in Fayetteville in August 2018. Talking about their experience, executive producer Scott Stephens said, "Everything we've needed has been right at our fingertips, from period architecture to abandoned buildings that still evoke the 80s," while lead actor Mahershala Ali added that "[the landscape] is such a character in the story. It would have been such a shame if we had shot it any other place." Pizzolatto, who spent four years of his life in Fayetteville as a student at the University of Arkansas, found the area evocative and powerful, and revealed that it was important for him to shoot the season in Arkansas, as this was the place he had in mind when he was writing the episodes.

Cast

Main cast 
 Mahershala Ali as Wayne Hays, a state police detective and a Vietnam War veteran
 Carmen Ejogo as Amelia Reardon, an Arkansas schoolteacher and aspiring writer who eventually marries Wayne Hays
 Stephen Dorff as Roland West, Wayne Hays' partner and later a lieutenant in the state police
 Scoot McNairy as Tom Purcell, a father of two missing children whose fate is tied to those of Wayne Hays and Roland West for over 10 years
 Ray Fisher as Henry Hays, Wayne Hays' and Amelia Reardon's son who has become a detective

Recurring cast 
 Mamie Gummer as Lucy Purcell, Tom Purcell's wife and mother of two missing children
 Josh Hopkins as Jim Dobkins, a private attorney involved in deposing state police detectives in an ongoing investigation
 Jodi Balfour as Lori, the long-term love interest of Roland West
 Deborah Ayorinde as Becca Hays, the estranged daughter of Wayne Hays
 Isaiah C. Morgan as Henry Hays, the son of Wayne Hays at age 9
 Corbin Pitts as Mike Ardoin, friend/classmate of Julie and Will Purcell 
 Rhys Wakefield as Freddy Burns, a local teenager caught up in the disappearance
 Michael Greyeyes as Brett Woodard, a Native American trash collector and Vietnam War veteran
 Jon Tenney as Alan Jones, a district attorney who is involved in the case and later assists Dobkins
 Brett Cullen as Gerald Kindt, an ambitious local district attorney and later Arkansas Attorney General
 Sarah Gadon as Elisa Montgomery, a true crime documentary filmmaker
 Emily Nelson as Margaret, a friend of Lucy Purcell
 Brandon Flynn as Ryan Peters, a local teenager caught up in the disappearance
 Michael Graziadei as Dan O'Brien, Lucy Purcell's cousin
 Scott Shepherd as Harris James, a police officer and later Chief of Security at Hoyt Foods
 Michael Rooker as Edward Hoyt, owner of the chicken processing plant Hoyt Foods
 Steven Williams as Junius "Mr. June" Watts, a former employee of Edward Hoyt
 Bea Santos as Julie Purcell, the missing daughter of Tom and Lucy Purcell, in the 1990 and 2015 time periods

Episodes

Reception

Critical response 

The third season received positive reviews, and was praised as a return to form in comparison to the mixed reception of the second season.

On Rotten Tomatoes, the season has a rating of 86%, based on 236 reviews, with an average rating of 7.45/10. The site's critical consensus reads, "Driven by Mahershala Ali's mesmerizing performance, True Detectives third season finds fresh perspective by exploring real-world events – though it loses some of the series' intriguing strangeness along the way." On Metacritic, the season has a score of 72 out of 100, based on 34 critics, indicating "generally favorable reviews".

Accolades

Home media 
The season was released on Blu-ray and DVD on September 3, 2019. In addition to the eight episodes, both formats contain bonus content including the featurettes "Designing the Decades" and "A Conversation with Nic Pizzolatto and T Bone Burnett" as well as deleted scenes and an extended version of the season finale.

References

External links 
 
 

2019 American television seasons
Television series set in 1980
Television series set in 1990
Television series set in 2015
Television shows set in Arkansas
True Detective
Arkansas State Police